WSU may refer to:

Universities

United States
 Washington State University in Pullman, Washington
 Wayne State University in Detroit, Michigan
 Weber State University in Ogden, Utah
 Western State University in Fullerton, California
 Westfield State University in Westfield, Massachusetts
 Wichita State University in Wichita, Kansas
 Winona State University in Winona, Minnesota
 Wisconsin State Universities (13 campuses)
 Worcester State University in Worcester, Massachusetts
 Wright State University in Dayton, Ohio

Africa
Walter Sisulu University in Mthatha, South Africa
Wolaita Sodo University in Wolaita, Ethiopia

Australia
Western Sydney University in Sydney, Australia

Transport
 West Sutton railway station, London, National Rail station code

Other
 Women Superstars United, a professional wrestling company
 Waikato Students' Union, New Zealand, publishers of Nexus (student magazine)
 White Student Union, organisation in Towson, Maryland, United States
 Amtrak code for station location Wausau, Wisconsin